Big Rocky Pond, also known as Rocky Pond, is a  pond in the Ponds of Plymouth neighborhood of Plymouth, Massachusetts. The pond is located west of Long Duck Pond and north of Big Sandy Pond. Access to the pond is along its northern shore.

There is another Rocky Pond within Plymouth's borders. It is located in the Myles Standish State Forest.

External links
MassWildlife - Pond Maps
Environmental Protection Agency

Ponds of Plymouth County, Massachusetts
Ponds of Massachusetts